This is a list of airlines of British Columbia which have an air operator's certificate issued by Transport Canada, the country's civil aviation authority. These are airlines that are based in British Columbia.

Current airlines

Defunct airlines

References

Aviation in British Columbia
British Columbia
Airlines